Saber Hardani; born October 27, 1996) is an Iranian Football winger who plays for Iranian club Nassaji Mazandaran in the Persian Gulf Pro League.

Club career
Hardani started his career with Foolad's youth team, Foolad Khuzestan B F.C. In the winter of 2016 he joined the first team by Naeim Saadavi and signed a three and half year contract which will keep him with the club until 2018. Hardani made his debut on August 5, 2016 against Zob Ahan CSC, as a substitute for Ayoub Vali.

Honours
Foolad
Hazfi Cup: 2020–21
Iranian Super Cup: 2021

Nassaji
Hazfi Cup: 2021–22

References

1996 births
Living people
Iranian footballers
Foolad FC players
Nassaji Mazandaran players
Persian Gulf Pro League players
People from Dezful
Association football wingers
Sportspeople from Khuzestan province